Manika Kaur is a devotional singer, songwriter, and philanthropist from Melbourne, Australia.

Early life 
Kaur was born and raised in Melbourne, Australia, and her parents were active members of the Sikh community. In 2006 she married and moved to Dubai.

Career 
In 2012 Kaur released a music video for the song “Guru Ram Das Rakho Sarnaee”, telling the life story of Guru Ram Das through shadow puppets. The video has over 4.6 million views on YouTube.

Bandhanaa (re-released as Satnam Waheguru) 
Kaur's debut album, Bandhanaa, was released in 2013 by Shemaroo Entertainment. The album was produced by Sukhbir Singh. In 2014, the album was re-mixed and re-released as Satanam Waheguru by Invincible Recordings.

I Bow To You Waheguru 
In 2015, Kaur's second album was released by United Sound Recordings through Proper Music Distribution. Its title track, "I Bow to You Waheguru", was produced by Talvin Singh.

The album features collaborations with Rakesh Chaurasia, Jyotsna Srikanth, Soumik Datta, Bernhard Schimpelsberger, and Reiner Erlings. She performed material from the album on the Sikh Channel, BBC London, and ABC Australia TV.

Sacred Words
Kaur's third album, Sacred Words, was released in 2018 on Martin ‘Youth’ Glover's label Suriya Recordings and was released in the US on imprint label partner Six Degrees Records. It features collaborations with Scottish folk musician James Yorkston, Jyotsna Srikanth (violin), and Tunde Jegede.

Discography

Philanthropy 
Through her foundation Kirtan for Causes, Kaur raises awareness for issues such as equality, global access to feminine hygiene products, and education of females of all ages around the world.

Her foundation currently supports the education of 100 programme participants and supports the education of over 200 children. Kaur raised over one million dirhams (approx. £210,000) through her first album, which she donated to finance a new Gurdwara (Sikh temple) in Dubai. All of the revenue from Kaur's work go to support her charity.

Awards 
Kaur won the 2016 Sikh Award for Sikhs in Entertainment and placed sacred Sikh vocal music and Kirtan in the World Music Charts Europe for the first time, amassing over 10,000,000 views on YouTube.

References

External links 
 

Living people
Kirtan performers
21st-century Australian women singers
Year of birth missing (living people)